"The Journal" is a two-part episode of American animated television series Hey Arnold! that aired as the nineteenth and twentieth episodes of the show's fifth season. It originally aired in the United States on Nickelodeon on November 11, 2002. The episode, which ended on a cliffhanger, revisited a plotline from the May 2000 episode "Parents Day". The cliffhanger remained unresolved up until the television film Hey Arnold!: The Jungle Movie premiered on November 24, 2017.

Plot
Arnold finds his father's journal in the attic of the boarding house that describes the adventures of his parents in the jungle of San Lorenzo, their marriage, Arnold's birth, and other details of their life. On the final page, it contains a map showing where they had to go after they left him to deliver medicine to the people of the jungle.

Production
The Journal originally premiered on November 11, 2002. It was originally designed as a cliffhanger as a lead-in to The Jungle Movie, a theatrical feature that was cancelled and years later revived as a two-part television movie.

Bartlett described the decision to end the episode on a cliffhanger was meant to act as a dare directed at Paramount Pictures who were considering producing a follow-up to the episode that would also act as a sequel to Hey Arnold!: The Movie. However, after the theatrical film failed to meet box office expectations, the studio made the decision to cancel the film, leaving the questions posed by the episode unresolved for over a decade until The Jungle Movie was released in 2017.

References

External links

 

Hey Arnold! episodes
2002 American television episodes
Television episodes set in the United States